Crime by Night  is a 1944 crime film directed by William Clemens, starring Jane Wyman and Jerome Cowan. It tells the story of Sam Campbell (Jerome Cowan) and his secretary Robbie Vance (Jane Wyman), who take a vacation and uncover a murder.

Plot
Larry Borden's career as a concert pianist ended when a dispute with wealthy father-in-law Harvey Carr ended up with his hand chopped by an ax. Carr is found dead from a blow by an ax, and Larry is sure to be the prime suspect. He hires New York detective Sam Campbell and his secretary-partner Robbie Vance. Harvey's daughter and Larry's ex-wife, Irene, also turn up, along with another dead body, the estate's handyman.

Irene is now engaged to Paul Goff, a singer, who has an agent, Ann Marlow. A theory develops that Carr's death involved a wartime spy ring and a chemical plant he owned, and Goff is implicated. Goff is the next murder victim, though. Sam and Robbie eventually deduce that Ann is the actual spy. They solve the case and save Larry, freeing them to return to New York.

Cast
 Jane Wyman as Robbie Vance
 Jerome Cowan as Sam Campbell
 Faye Emerson as Ann Marlow
 Charles Lang as Paul Goff
 Eleanor Parker as Irene Carr
 Stuart Crawford as Larry Borden
 Cy Kendall as Sheriff Max Ambers
 Charles C. Wilson as District Attorney Hyatt

Production
The film was based on the novel Forty Whacks by Geoffrey Homes. In December 1941 Warners announced they would film it as a vehicle for Humphrey Bogart instead of a sequel to The Maltese Falcon.

See also
List of American films of 1944

References

External links
 
 
 

1944 films
Films directed by William Clemens
Warner Bros. films
1940s English-language films
American crime drama films
Films scored by William Lava
1944 crime drama films
American black-and-white films
1940s American films